Peter Ittersagen (born September 28, 1985) is a former American football cornerback, last with the Edmonton Eskimos of the Canadian Football League. He was signed by the Jacksonville Jaguars as an undrafted free agent in 2009. He played college football at Wheaton. He is married to Annie Ittersagen (née Torppey), a former Wheaton College student and lifelong Wheaton resident.

Early life and childhood
Ittersagen graduated from Wheaton North High School in 2004 and went on to graduate from Wheaton in 2009.

Professional career

Jacksonville Jaguars
After going undrafted in the 2009 NFL Draft, Ittersagen signed with the Jacksonville Jaguars as an undrafted free agent on April 27, 2009. He was cut on September 5, 2009.

Tennessee Titans
Ittersagen was signed by the Tennessee Titans on August 2, 2010. He was cut on August 31, 2010 and re-signed to the practice squad on September 5. He was promoted to the active roster on December 17, 2010.

Edmonton Eskimos
Ittersagen was signed by the Edmonton Eskimos on May 29, 2012, but was released with the final roster cuts on June 23, 2012. He joined the Eskimos practice roster on September 6, 2012.

References

External links
Just Sports Stats
Edmonton Eskimos player bio
Tennessee Titans bio
ESPN.com bio

1985 births
Living people
American football cornerbacks
Edmonton Elks players
Jacksonville Jaguars players
Sportspeople from Wheaton, Illinois
Players of American football from Illinois
Tennessee Titans players
Wheaton Thunder football players